Huliaipole is a city in Polohy Raion, Zaporizhzhia Oblast, Ukraine. It is known as the birthplace of Ukrainian anarchist revolutionary Nestor Makhno. In 2021, it had a population of  Huliaipole was attacked by Russian forces during the 2022 Russian invasion of Ukraine and sustained heavy damage, placing it on one of the lines of contact between Ukrainian and Russian-occupied territory.

History 
Prior to the annexation of the Crimean Khanate by the Russian Empire, the area was mostly settled by the Zaporozhian Cossacks and the nomadic Lesser Nogai Horde. When Catherine the Great dissolved the Sich, the local Cossacks either fled into exile or were brought into serfdom, with the residents of what is now Huliaipole falling under the yoke of the Shabelskiys.

In 1785, the board of the Yekaterinoslav Governorate ordered the Novomoskovsk Zemstvo Court to establish the Huliaipole state military settlement for protection from the Crimean Khanate. Archival data confirmed that the first settlers came to the newly formed settlement from the territory of Starodubsky District, and later Kyiv region, Chernihiv region, Poltava region and Sloboda Ukraine. The name "Huliaipole" reflected the nature of the area where it was founded, which had frequently played host to fairs for a long time before the settlement's foundation. The settlement was traditionally divided into centuries, administrative-territorial units formed along military lines. Hundreds of people from Podolia, Pishchanka, Guryan, Verbiv, Bokhansky, Kherson and later Poland settled in this way. In 1794 the settlement had 150 yards. The inhabitants of the region were actively engaged in agriculture and animal husbandry. 

In 1797 the wooden Orthodox Church "Exaltation of the Honest and Life-Giving Christ" was built, and Huliaipole became the township center of Alexandrovsky Uyezd.

Industrialization
From the middle of the 19th to the beginning of the 20th century, the village of Huliaipole was transformed into a commercial and industrial town. In 1859, the first trades fair took place in Huliaipole. There were more than fifty trading companies with a total turnover of 1 million rubles. Next to them there were a large number of shops. The increased trade contributed to a large influx of population. 

In the post-reform period, industrial enterprises emerged one after another in Huliaipole. In 1882, Krieger's factory of agricultural machinery began operating. Ten years later, another such plant and steam mill was opened by the industrialist Kerner. Both factories produced harvesters, horse threshers, choppers, and so on. The landowner Schroeder also had a large steam mill. In the following years, distilleries, several oil mills, and warehouses were put into operation. There were 18 shops in the village, and about three dozen merchants traded. In 1898, the Chaplyne-Berdyansk railway was laid nearby, which had a positive effect on the economic development of the village.

There were 2 agricultural machinery factories, four distilleries and one brewery in Huliaipole. There were three steam mills in Huliaipole and dozens more in the surrounding villages and economies that were part of Huliaipole parish. Besides them, there were a large number of peasant "windmills" around. In addition, there were two brick and tile factories in Huliaipole and twelve in villages and hamlets.

Along with industrial enterprises, in the village there were a dozen small, semi-artisanal productions - a crew workshop, several potters, as well as oil mills, smithies, carpentry and other workshops.

From 1884 until the First World War, Zemstvo exhibitions and auctions of agricultural and industrial products took place in Huliaipole every three years.

Conflict

After World War I, new socio-economic transformations took place in Huliaipole, caused by the change of state power and political regime. Between 1917 and 1921, reflective of the turbulence in the region brought about by the Russian Civil War (and concurrent Ukrainian War of Independence), the town changed hands no fewer than sixteen times. During this period, Huliaipole was variously held by Austro-Hungarian forces, the Red Army, the Ukrainian People's Republic, the Hetmanate, Anton Denikin's White Army and the Nestor Makhno's Insurgent Army, among others. During the conflict, Huliaipole became widely known as the headquarters of the Revolutionary Insurgent Army of Ukraine and the capital of the Makhnovshchina.

During the industrialization of the 1930s, a rapid industrial development began to take place in Huliaipole, resulting in it gaining city status in 1938. Meanwhile, at least 108 residents of Huliaipole died during the Holodomor of 1932–1933.

On October 5, 1941, as a result of the German offensive, Soviet troops fled the city and it was occupied by the Wehrmacht. On September 16, 1943, it was liberated by the Soviet troops of the Southern Front during the Donbas strategic offensive.

Modern era
In 1952, a brick factory, a butter factory, a garment and footwear factory, a pedagogical school, a secondary school, four seven-year schools, six elementary schools, a cinema and a club functioned here. In 1970, there was an agricultural machinery plant, a paint and varnish plant, an auto repair plant, a household goods plant, a cheese-making plant and a shoe factory.

By the time of the Declaration of Independence of Ukraine, the basis of the city's economy was an agricultural machinery plant, a paints and varnishes plant, a shoe factory and food industry enterprises. In May 1995, the Government of Ukraine approved the decision on the privatization of the agricultural machinery plant, the paints and varnishes plant, regional agricultural and chemistry plants. In July 1995, a decision was approved on the privatization of the state farm. On December 17, 2004, the economic court of the Zaporizhzhia Oblast filed a bankruptcy case against a privatized agricultural machinery plant.

On July 17, 2020, as a result of administrative-territorial reform and liquidation of Huliaipole Raion, the city became a part of Polohy Raion.

During the Southern Ukraine offensive of the 2022 Russian invasion of Ukraine, a battle for control of Huliaipole broke out between the Russian Armed Forces and Ukrainian Armed Forces. Under constant bombardment by Russian forces, many of Huliaipole's residents have been evacuated by the local administration, while a number of residential buildings and civilian infrastructure has been damaged or destroyed.

Geography 
The town of Huliaipole is located in the Gaichur river valley (the name of the reservoir is etymologized from the Turkic languages: gai "free" + chur "steppe"), upstream at a distance of 3.5 km is the village of Marfopil, downstream at a distance of 1.5 km is the village of Zelene. It is located 8 km from the railway station of the same name and 98 km from the regional center of Zaporozhye (via highways H08 and T 0814). In the north, Polohy Raion borders with Synelnykove Raion of the Dnipropetrovsk Oblast, in the east - with Donetsk.

Demographics

Famous people
 Voldemar Antoni (1886–1974), Ukrainian anarchist intellectual, founder of the Union of Poor Peasants
 Vilen Kalyuta (1930–1999), Ukrainian cinematographer
 Semen Karetnyk (1893–1920), Ukrainian anarchist, commander of the Revolutionary Insurgent Army of Ukraine
 Nestor Makhno (1888–1934), Ukrainian anarchist, commander of the Revolutionary Insurgent Army of Ukraine
 Oleksandr Semenyuta (1883–1910), Ukrainian insurrectionary anarchist, leader of the Union of Poor Peasants

Gallery

References

External links
 The murder of the Jews of Huliaipole during World War II, at Yad Vashem website.

Cities in Zaporizhzhia Oblast
Alexandrovsky Uyezd (Yekaterinoslav Governorate)
Makhnovshchina
Cities of district significance in Ukraine
Populated places established in the Russian Empire
Holocaust locations in Ukraine
1785 establishments in the Russian Empire
1938 establishments in the Soviet Union